TMCR or Today's More Choice Radio is a community radio station in Thorne, near Doncaster in South Yorkshire.

TMCR was set up as a Restricted Service Licence or 'trial station' to see how it would be received by the communities of Thorne and Moorends. Supported by Doncaster Metropolitan Borough Council, and with financial backing through the Neighbourhood Renewal Fund, a four-week period on-air was run from a studio in Thorne.

Launch

TMCR was launched with a 28-day trial broadcast in the summer of 2005 on 87.9 FM. The opening was performed by Ed Miliband MP in his capacity as member for Doncaster North. Preparations were being made to start full-time broadcasts from October 2009 with the main launch date pencilled in as 16 November with a frequency of 95.3 FM. Due to funding issues, this date had to be postponed. A new launch date of Monday 14 December 2009 was decided upon, broadcasts commenced at 9.53 am. Test transmissions were heard on 95.3 FM from 27 November.

Background

In 2005 a temporary studio/office was set up in Thorne town centre. This was used for the short-term broadcast in the summer of that year, then the group moved to The Winning Post, Moorends, in early 2007. Whilst the licence application was being prepared, submitted and achieved, some training sessions were held with local people and students of the Trinity Academy. Due mainly to lack of funding, the studio had been unavailable for long periods of time as much of the work was being done away from the office.

Building to licence application

An application for a full 5-year licence was submitted to Ofcom in June 2007. On 20 December 2007 an announcement was made by OfCom that TMCR was to be offered a five-year community radio licence

In January 2008, the committee registered the group as a company limited by guarantee, TMCRFM Limited no. 6471394, in preparation for the future expansion of the group and the service it will offer. Funding applications made in 2009 were intended to have the station return to the airwaves in October 2009 on a full-time basis. This was deferred to 14 December after last minute funding issues.

The transmitter site has been determined as SE685134, which gives coverage to Thorne, Moorends, Fishlake, Stainforth, Dunscroft, Hatfield and parts of several other local communities. Clearance of 95.3 as the broadcast frequency has been made by OfCom.

Community activity

Members of the team are appearing at events in the area, such as the annual Thorne Festival and various shows. The station has the remit to promote all local opportunities, events and services that are provided for the benefit of station listeners. This involves working with other community groups in collating information and making on-air announcements.

TMCR have provided PA at many local events during the summer months, appearing at the Thorne Festival, Thorne Regatta, Community As One day, Doncaster Disabled Games, as well as various Sunday afternoons on the bandstand in Thorne Memorial Park.

'Today's More Choice Radio' as TMCR is now known; is very active in the North East of Doncaster and will be here for a long time to come serving the community.

Schedule

Shows run all week from 7 am until 9 pm. You will be updated about the weather, news, travel, and community news. Music is played throughout the night as well by Sandy the Jukebox. A full listing of the shows and the schedule can be seen on the TMCR website.

The TMCR show presents

 Mick Finley 
 Malcolm Ley
 Mark Walmsley
 Steve Hanks
 Lewis Gates

Sandy the Juke Box automated.

Past members

 Gordon Sharpe 
 Robert (Bob) Ashton
 Sue Mundin
 Kieth Fox
 Ian Gilligan
 Duncan Hedley
 Craig Headley
 Claire Hedley
 Jane Lloyd (Secretary)
 Brian Fill
 Lucy Doxey
 Joshua Bull (Sales/Advertising)
 Kirsten Martin
 Michael Tiller (IT Support)
 Kirsty Bradbury
 Adrian Slack

Perter Lee
Yvonne Cole 
Gary Kelly
Kim B Lee
Dennis Hartley 
Madeline Roberts

References

External links
 TMCR FM – Today's More Choice Radio Official website.
 doncastercsep.org.uk – Funding details.
 thorne-moorends.gov.uk Council website (details on funding).
 OfCom Governing body for radio in the UK.
Thorne Times TMCR – The more choice radio station
 Thorne Today What did you think of Community Radio
 Thorne Gazette The Mayor drops in with a donation.
 Thorne Gazette Radio station is on the air soon (5 November 2009)
 National Lottery gives grant National Lottery press release
 OfCom, Community Radio Fund TMCR make successful bid for OfCom grant, July 2010.
 Thorne Today Funds flood in for Community Radio Station
 Thorne Today Council is amped up

Radio stations in Yorkshire
Mass media in Doncaster
Community radio stations in the United Kingdom
Thorne, South Yorkshire